Another Hope is a Star Wars fan fiction novel that became controversial in 2006 when its author, Lori Jareo, released it for commercial sale.

Plot
Another Hope is an alternative history re-imagining of the events in Star Wars Episode IV: A New Hope (1977). Mixing familiar moments from the film with new story material, Jareo drew inspiration and mixed in elements from the prequel films.  The book deals in minute details of the Death Star, the politics of Darth Vader's henchmen, and insight into Vader and Princess Leia's adoptive parents. Biggs Darklighter, a minor character in the film, has been given an expanded role. The text adds a "Mary Sue" version of Ryoo Naberrie, described as "a gutsy underling on the Death Star".

Publication and response
Jareo printed the book through her WordTech Communications company, and made the material available for sale through Amazon.com, Barnes & Noble, and Powell's City of Books. Jareo claimed the book was "not a commercial project", and that copyright law was not an issue because she wrote the book for herself. Despite these claims, Jareo agreed to Lucasfilm's request to stop selling Another Hope. Science-fiction authors Keith R. A. DeCandido and Lee Goldberg observed that problems with Another Hope would impact, and perhaps harm, print on demand publications.

References

External links
WordTech Communications LLC - Another Hope publisher
To Blur Plagiarism's Lines, Look to Star Wars - All Things Considered discusses the book

Fan fiction works
Books based on Star Wars